Hells Halfacre is an unincorporated community located in Harrison County, Kentucky, United States.

References

Unincorporated communities in Harrison County, Kentucky
Unincorporated communities in Kentucky